Toronto Township is a former municipality now mostly part of Mississauga, Ontario, Canada, with its northern extremity now a part of Brampton. It is directly west of but not part of the city of Toronto, and its land area makes up the majority of present-day Mississauga.

History
Toronto Township was formed as a locally unincorporated part of York County, Upper Canada on  when officials from York (what is now the City of Toronto) purchased  of land from the Mississaugas (First Nations people) for 1,000 Pounds. After the land was surveyed, much of it was given by the Crown in the form of land grants to Loyalists. More than a dozen small communities grew in this area, most of which were located near natural resources, waterways for industry and fishing, and routes leading into York. The township became part of Peel County in 1851. In 1873, in light of the continued growth seen in this area, Toronto Township was incorporated as a rural municipality and a council was created to oversee the affairs of the various villages that were unincorporated at that time. The council's responsibilities included road maintenance, the establishment of a police force, and mail delivery service.

Toronto Township was a municipality until 1967, when the town's citizens and politicians voted to change the town's name to Mississauga over Sheridan. Mississauga became a city seven years later in 1974, and ceded its northernmost area (and thus lands formerly part of the township) to Brampton.

See also
List of townships in Ontario

References

History of Mississauga
Former municipalities in Ontario
Former townships in Ontario
1805 establishments in Upper Canada
Populated places disestablished in 1967